Svetlana Yakovlevna Jitomirskaya (born June 4, 1966) is a Soviet-born American mathematician working on dynamical systems and mathematical physics. She is a distinguished professor of mathematics at the University of California, Irvine. She is best known for solving the ten martini problem along with mathematician Artur Avila.

Education and career
Jitomirskaya was born and grew up in Kharkiv. Both her mother, Valentina Borok, and her father, Yakov Zhitomirskii, were professors of mathematics.

Her undergraduate studies were at Moscow State University, where she was a student of, among others, Vladimir Arnold and Yakov Sinai. She obtained her Ph.D. from Moscow State University in 1991 under the supervision of Yakov Sinai. She joined the mathematics department at the University of California, Irvine in 1991 as a lecturer, and she became an assistant professor there in 1994 and a full professor in 2000.

Honors 
In 2005, she was awarded the Ruth Lyttle Satter Prize in Mathematics, "for her pioneering work on non-perturbative quasiperiodic localization".

She was an invited speaker at the 2002 International Congress of Mathematicians, in Beijing. She was a plenary speaker at the 2022 International Congress of Mathematicians, originally scheduled for Saint Petersburg. After the Russian invasion of Ukraine in February 2022, congress organizers changed plans, and moved some events online, and others to Helsinki, Finland. Jitomirskaya's July 14 plenary address, Small denominators and multiplicative Jensen's formula, is available online.

She received a Sloan Fellowship in 1996.

In 2018 she was named to the American Academy of Arts and Sciences.

Jitomirskaya is the 2020 winner of the Dannie Heineman Prize for Mathematical Physics, becoming the second woman to win the prize and the first woman to be the sole winner of the prize. The award citation credited her "for work on the spectral theory of almost-periodic Schrödinger operators and related questions in dynamical systems. In particular, for her role in the solution of the Ten Martini problem, concerning the Cantor set nature of the spectrum of all almost Mathieu operators and in the development of the fundamental mathematical aspects of the localization and metal-insulator transition phenomena."

In 2022, she was elected to the National Academy of Sciences. On July 2 2022, she received the inaugural Ladyzhenskaya Prize in Mathematical Physics (OAL Prize) “for her seminal and deep contributions to the spectral theory of almost periodic Schrödinger operators” https://2022.worldwomeninmaths.org/OAL-prize-winner.

Selected publications 
.
.
.

References

External links 
 Home page of Svetlana Jitomirskaya
.
 
 

1966 births
Moscow State University alumni
University of California, Irvine faculty
Ukrainian mathematicians
Scientists from Kharkiv
Ukrainian women mathematicians
Ukrainian SSR emigrants to the United States
Ukrainian Jews
Living people
Dynamical systems theorists
Fellows of the American Academy of Arts and Sciences